The Quebec City Monarks are the Quebec City Canadian football team in the Ligue de Football Majeur du Quebec.

They have won the regular season league championship as well as the Silver Cup in 2005, 2006, and 2007 since joining the league in 2003.

References

External links
Official website of the Quebec Monarks 
LFMQ's Monarks website 
Official website of the Ligue de Football Majeur du Quebec 

Sports teams in Quebec City
Mon